The Russian Cup is a football competition held annually by the Football Union of Russia for professional  and some amateur (only after a special permission and licensing by Russian Football Union) football clubs.

The winner of the competition ordinarily got a spot in the UEFA Europa League group stage. However, all Russian clubs, as well as the national team, have been barred from European competition due to Russia's invasion of Ukraine.

Participants
All clubs from the Russian Premier League, First Division and Second Division as well as amateur clubs compete for the Russian Cup.

Competition system
The competition is held under knockout format. Second Division teams start from 1/512, 1/256, or 1/128 final stage, depending on the number of teams in the corresponding Second Division zone. First Division teams enter the tournament at 1/32 final stage, and Premier League teams at 1/16 final stage. All ties are one-legged. The final tie is played as a single match; traditionally, it had been held in Moscow, but since 2009 has moved around the country. First round matches are usually played in April, with the final being played the following year in May, so each Russian Cup competition lasts for more than a year.

Finals
The Russian Cup has been played since 1992. The finals have produced the following results:

Performance by club

Trivia
To date, Terek Grozny is the only club which has won the Russian Cup while playing in the Russian Football National League, the second league of Russian football.

See also
Football in Russia
Soviet Cup

Notes

References

External links

  Russian Cup on the website of the Russian Football Union
  Russia – Cup Finals, RSSSF.com
 Russian Cup summary - Soccerway

 
Cup
National association football cups
Professional sports leagues in Russia